Canolfan Tryweryn is the National White Water Centre for Wales, and is based near Bala in north Wales. It developed the first commercial white water rafting operation in the UK in 1986, and since then has grown to become the largest and one of the most well-known rafting organisations in the UK. The centre is home to paddlesport National Governing Body Canoe Wales. The National White Water Centre is ideal for canoeing, kayaking, play-boating and coached groups who sometimes run BCU/CW Star Awards.

The River Tryweryn

The Tryweryn is a river in north Wales. It flows from Llyn Celyn in the Snowdonia National Park and after 19 km (12 miles) joins the river Dee at Bala. It is one of the main tributaries of the Dee and has been dammed to form Llyn Celyn. Water is stored in winter when flows are high, and released over the summer to maintain the flow in the Dee, meaning that the river often has suitable water levels for kayakers and rafters at time of year when natural rivers throughout Wales may be too low. Usually between 9 and 12 m³/s (2000 to 3000 gallons per second) are released by the dam.

The whitewater rapids have been modified by placing boulders in strategic points along the course of the river to create eddys, drops and play spots.

Access to the centre requires payment for both commercial and non-commercial users. 

The river is generally split into three sections: Top Site, Centre Section and the Lower Tryweryn.

Top Site
This constitutes the section of river leading from the stilling basin below the Llyn Celyn dam down to where the fish trap was located. The fish-trap – known as the chipper because it resembles a chip-slicer – was removed in November 2019.
This section is a nice Grade II to Grade III, with a good play-hole (the "Top-Hole") and a playful weir. The section is often used for safety and rescue courses, as well as kayaking freestyle competitions. Officially there is no raft or canoe access to this top section.

The Centre Section

It contains most of the main features of the river (in order of occurrence):
 The Graveyard
 The Ski Jump
 Fedwr Gog Falls (aka Miss Davis' Bridge, or 'Stone' bridge),
 Café Wave
 Fingers
 NRA (National Rivers Authority) Bridge
 Chapel Falls

The Lower Tryweryn
This section is not managed like the upper Tryweryn, although the centre has been known to remove fallen trees and other obstructions/hazards quickly.

See also
Afon Tryweryn
Cardiff International White Water
Canoe Wales
British Canoe Union
Welsh Canoeing Association
International Scale of River Difficulty

References

External links
 

Llandderfel
Llanycil
River Dee, Wales
Tourist attractions in Gwynedd
Canoeing in Wales
Canoeing and kayaking venues in the United Kingdom